The Nacra 15 is a performance catamaran used for racing. It went into production in 2015. It was designed as a smaller version of the Olympic multihull class, the Nacra 17.

Youth Selection
In early 2015, World Sailing announced that they were looking for a new youth multihull for the ISAF Youth World Championships with a targeted crew weight of approx 110–130 kg . Nacra Sailing announced two bids for the trials, the existing Nacra 16 and the all new Nacra 15. After the trials and extensive consideration by World Sailing at their AGM in China, the Nacra 15 was confirmed as the new Youth World Championships class. It was also un-expectedly announced as a new class for the Youth Olympic Games.
In 2016 British RYA selected the Nacra 15 as their new Youth Multihull boat, replacing the Spitfire.

Configurations

Events

Youth Olympic Games

Open World Championships

Youth World Championships

Foiling World Championships

European Championships

Youth Olympic Games Qualifiers

European Super Series

References

External links
 Nacra Sailing, the builders
 World Sailing Youth Olympics Microsite Website
 Nacra 15 (YouTube video)

Catamarans
Youth Olympic sailing classes
Classes of World Sailing
Sailboat type designs by Gino Morrelli
Sailboat type designs by Pete Melvin
Sailboat types built by Nacra Sailing